Saksun is a village near the northwest coast of the Faroese island of Streymoy, in Sunda Municipality.

Geography
Saksun lies in the bottom of what used to be an inlet of the sea, surrounded by high mountains. 
The inlet formed a good deep natural harbour, until a storm blocked it with sand. The old harbour become an inaccessible seawater lagoon, only accessible by small boats on high tide.

Facilities
The village has a church and museum. The church was originally built in Tjørnuvík, but in 1858 it was disassembled, carried over the mountains and reassembled in Saksun. The Museum occupies a seventeenth-century farm house called Dúvugarður. The house belongs to the Dúvugarður farm, still an active sheep farm with approximately 710 ewes.

Gallery

See also
 List of towns in the Faroe Islands

External links

Faroeislands.dk: Saksun Images and description of all cities on the Faroe Islands.
Guide to Faroe Islands: Saksun

Saksun